Just Nuts is a 1915 American short comedy film featuring Harold Lloyd playing Willie Work, one of the characters that preceded his glasses character. It is also the only surviving film featuring Lloyd as Willie Work. Prints of the film survive in the film archives at George Eastman House and the Museum of Modern Art.

Cast
 Harold Lloyd as Willie Work
 Jane Novak as The Pretty Girl
 Roy Stewart as Willie's Rival

See also
 Harold Lloyd filmography

References

External links

1915 films
1915 short films
American silent short films
1915 comedy films
American black-and-white films
Films directed by Hal Roach
Silent American comedy films
American comedy short films
1910s American films